

Preseason

Wade Watch list
On July 30, the Women's Basketball Coaches Association (WBCA), on behalf of the Wade Coalition, announced the 2009-2010 preseason "Wade Watch" list for The State Farm Wade Trophy Division I Player of the Year.  The list includes three players from the ACC:
Jessica Breland, North Carolina
Jacinta Monroe, Florida State
Monica Wright, Virginia

Big Ten/ACC Challenge

All-Atlantic Coast players

Regular season

Rankings
The rankings apply to the ESPN/USA Today poll. 
NR = Not ranked

^Final Poll = ESPN/USA Today Coaches Poll

In season honors

Conference honors

All-Atlantic Coast Academic team

National Awards & Honors

National Awards

All-American

Statistical leaders

Postseason

NCAA tournament

Other Tournaments

References